Thomas Albert may refer to:

 Thomas Albert (born 1948), American composer and educator
 Thomas Albert (politician), American politician from Michigan